Kumsa Moroda (Oromo: Kumsaa Morodaa was the third and last Moti, or ruler, of the Welega kingdom also known as the Leqa Neqamte state. His father was Moti Moroda Bekere. 

Under his rule, Nekemte continued to prosper, despite the re-imposition of central authority; Russian explorer Alexander Bulatovich visited Nekemte on 13 March 1897; in his memoirs he describes its marketplace as "a very lively place and presents a motley mixture of languages, dress, and peoples", and carefully described the paintings in the town's newly constructed Ethiopian Orthodox church. In 1905, a central government customs office was officially opened in Nekemte.

His cousin was the businessman and historian Blatta Deressa Amante, father of the senior statesman Lij Yilma Deressa.

See also
List of rulers of Leqa Naqamte

References

Oromo people
Rulers of Leqa Naqamte
Governors of Ethiopia
People from Nekemte
Converts to Tewahedo Orthodoxy
Ethiopian military personnel
19th-century Oriental Orthodox Christians
20th-century Oriental Orthodox Christians